Red Chute is a census-designated place (CDP) in Bossier Parish, Louisiana, United States. The population was 6,261 at the 2010 census. It is part of the Shreveport–Bossier City Metropolitan Statistical Area.

Geography
Red Chute is located at  (32.564841, -93.609777). It is bordered to the west by Bossier City and to the east by Eastwood. U.S. Routes 80/79 is the main highway through Red Chute, leading west  to downtown Shreveport. Interstate 20 forms the southern edge of the CDP but has no direct access to it. Interstate 220 branches off I-20 in Bossier City, just to the west of Red Chute, with the closest access to the CDP from Exit 17 (US 80/79).

Demographics

2020 census

As of the 2020 United States census, there were 7,065 people, 2,841 households, and 1,865 families residing in the CDP.

2000 census
As of the census of 2000, there were 5,984 people, 2,133 households, and 1,723 families residing in the CDP. The racial makeup of the CDP was 88.87% White, 7.22% African American, 0.74% Native American, 0.80% Asian, 0.08% Pacific Islander, 0.75% from other races, and 1.54% from two or more races. Hispanic or Latino of any race were 3.09% of the population.

There were 2,133 households, out of which 42.8% had children under the age of 18 living with them, 67.3% were married couples living together, 9.9% had a female householder with no husband present, and 19.2% were non-families. 15.2% of all households were made up of individuals, and 3.9% had someone living alone who was 65 years of age or older. The average household size was 2.80 and the average family size was 3.11.

In the CDP, the population was spread out, with 28.9% under the age of 18, 7.4% from 18 to 24, 33.1% from 25 to 44, 24.0% from 45 to 64, and 6.6% who were 65 years of age or older. The median age was 35 years. For every 100 females, there were 99.1 males. For every 100 females age 18 and over, there were 96.4 males.

The median income for a household in the CDP was $54,848, and the median income for a family was $60,432. Males had a median income of $37,312 versus $27,649 for females. The per capita income for the CDP was $21,908. About 2.6% of families and 5.0% of the population were below the poverty line, including 4.2% of those under age 18 and 4.2% of those age 65 or over.

Notable person

References

Census-designated places in Louisiana
Census-designated places in Bossier Parish, Louisiana
Census-designated places in Shreveport – Bossier City metropolitan area